Nina Nadira binti Naharuddin (born 5 July 1992), is a Malaysian singer, actress and television host. She is a former contestant of Akademi Fantasia 2014.

Akademi Fantasia 2014

Song list 
The list of songs that are given to Nina during AF2014
First Concert: "Gelora Jiwa" – original songs by P. Ramlee
Second Concert: "Zombie" – original songs by The Cranberries
Third Concert: "Ilusi" – original songs by Adira Suhaimi
Fourth Concert: "Dondang Dendang" – original songs by Noraniza Idris
Fifth Concert: "Ku Mohon" – original songs by Sheila Majid
Sixth Concert: "Layar Impian" – original songs by Ella
Seventh Concert: "Itulah Sayang" – original songs by P. Ramlee & Noormadiah
Eighth Concert: "Rescue" – original songs by Yuna

Naharuddin was chosen as the best performance by the AF2014's principal through her performance, Zombie. She was eliminated on the 8th week of Af2014 with Zarif.

Personal life
Nina marries architect Ahmad Farhan Rusman on 29 July 2017. They have a daughter named Nina Lillyana.

Filmography

Drama
 2014: Dee (Astro Ria) – as Ria, cameo
 2015: M.A.I.D (Astro Ria) – as Iman
 2016: Sesal Separuh Nyawa (HyppSensasi) – as Melissa
 2016: Isteri Vs Tunang (Astro Ria) as Mia
 2016: Akadku Yang Terakhir (Astro Prima) as Zalia

Telemovie
 2015: M.A.I.D Pun Nak Raya (Astro Ria)
 2015: Ketupat Jantung Hati (Astro Ria)

Television
 2015: H!Live (Astro)
 2015: VivoRazzi (Astro)
 2016: Euromaxx (HyppTV)
 2017: How Do I Look Asia (DIVA) – special guest

Discography 
"Misteri"

References

External links
 
 
 

1992 births
Living people
Malaysian television personalities
21st-century Malaysian women singers
Singing talent show contestants
Akademi Fantasia participants